This is a list of Australian street artists.

References

Street art in Australia
Lists of artists by medium
Australian
Street artists